Weston or Weston Village is a settlement in the Borough of Halton, Cheshire, England. Formerly a separate village, it is now part of the town of Runcorn.

Geography
Weston overlooks the Mersey river, and is separated from a large Ineos (formerly ICI) chemical plant by the Weston Point Expressway.

The Grade II* listed St John the Evangelist's Church is located in the village.

Chemical works
 Castner-Kellner Works, made trichloroethylene and perchloroethylene (tetrachloroethylene) and PVC
 Rocksavage Works, former ICI near the current Rocksavage Power Station, it made chlorinated methane products, and fluorocarbons for aerosol products, under the Arcton tradename

References

Chemical industry in the United Kingdom
Economy of Cheshire
Runcorn
Villages in Cheshire